The New Zealand Republican Party of 1995 was a political party which campaigned for the creation of a New Zealand republic as one of its main policies. It existed from 1995 to 2002.

Founding

The party was registered as an incorporated society on 24 January 1995 as "The Confederation of United Tribes of New Zealand Incorporated" but changed its name on 8 February 1995 to the New Zealand Republican Party. It was led by William Powell.

1996 election

Although the party was registered in time for the 1996 election, it was late in submitting its party list. The party challenged its exclusion as a result of failing to submit a list at the High Court of New Zealand, and attempted to have the 1996 elections postponed to allow this. Their application for an injunction was rejected however.

1999 election

In the 1999 election, the party submitted a list, but won only 0.01% (292 votes in total) of the vote, the lowest of all registered parties. The party was officially de-registered on 24 June 2002, just before the 2002 election.

See also
 Republicanism in New Zealand

References

Political parties established in 1995
Defunct political parties in New Zealand
Republicanism in New Zealand
Republican parties
Political parties disestablished in 2002
1995 establishments in New Zealand
2002 disestablishments in New Zealand
Single-issue political parties in New Zealand